Jacinthe Taillon (born January 1, 1977) is a Canadian competitor in synchronized swimming and Olympic medalist.

Born in Saint-Eustache, Quebec, Taillon participated on the Canadian team that received a bronze medal in synchronized team at the 2000 Summer Olympics in Sydney, Australia.

She also won a gold medal at the 1999 Pan American Games in the team event and a gold medal at the 1998 Commonwealth Games in the Duet event.

References

1977 births
Canadian synchronized swimmers
French Quebecers
Living people
Olympic bronze medalists for Canada
Olympic synchronized swimmers of Canada
People from Saint-Eustache, Quebec
Synchronized swimmers at the 2000 Summer Olympics
Olympic medalists in synchronized swimming
Medalists at the 2000 Summer Olympics
Commonwealth Games medallists in synchronised swimming
Commonwealth Games gold medallists for Canada
Pan American Games medalists in synchronized swimming
Synchronized swimmers at the 1999 Pan American Games
Pan American Games gold medalists for Canada
Medalists at the 1999 Pan American Games
Synchronised swimmers at the 1998 Commonwealth Games
Medallists at the 1998 Commonwealth Games